Oh No I Love You is the second studio album by the British singer Tim Burgess. It was released in 2012.

Louder Than War ranked it fifth in their list of the 200 best albums of 2012.

Track listing
 OGEN025CD
"White"
"The Doors of Then"
"A Case For Vinyl"
"The Graduate"
"Hours"
"Tobacco Fields"
"Anytime Minutes"
"The Great Outdoors Bitches"
"The Economy"
"A Gain"

References

2012 albums
Tim Burgess albums
Experimental pop albums